The 2006 OFC Beach Soccer championship also known as the 2006 FIFA Beach Soccer World Cup qualifiers for (OFC) was the first beach soccer championship for Oceania, held from late August to early September, in Moorea, Tahiti, French Polynesia.
The Solomon Islands won the championship, who moved on to play in the 2006 FIFA Beach Soccer World Cup in Rio de Janeiro, Brazil from November 2 - November 12.

Competing nations

 (hosts)

Group stage

Day 1

Day 2

Day 3

Knockout stage

Third place play-off

Final

Winners

Final standings

References

Beach Soccer Championship
FIFA Beach Soccer World Cup qualification (OFC)
International association football competitions hosted by French Polynesia
Beach
2006 in beach soccer